Hong Kong is a Special Administrative Region of the People's Republic of China, and was formerly part of the British Empire and Commonwealth of Nations.

Hong Kong may also refer to:

Arts and entertainment
Hong Kong (album), a 1994 album by Jean Michel Jarre
Hong Kong (film), a 1952 American film
Hong Kong (TV series), a 1960–1961 American series
The Hong Kong, an American rock band
"Hong Kong", a song by Gorillaz from D-Sides

Places
Hong Kong Island, an island forming part of the Hong Kong special administrative region
3297 Hong Kong, a main-belt asteroid

Transportation
HMS Hong Kong (K585) or HMS Tobago (K585), a British Royal Navy frigate
Hong Kong (Area Control Centre), an air traffic control center
Air Hong Kong, an all-cargo airline founded in 1986
Hong Kong Airlines, an airline based in Hong Kong founded in 2006
Hong Kong Airways, an airline based in British Hong Kong 1947–1959
Hong Kong station, a terminus on the Hong Kong Mass Transit Railway system

See also
British Hong Kong, the territory under British administration from 1841 to 1997
Hong Kong people
"Hong Kong, Hong Kong", a song by Teresa Teng
Hong Kong Phooey, a 1974 animated TV series
Hong Kong flu, a flu pandemic of 1968 and 1969
Hong Kong 97 (disambiguation)
2019–20 Hong Kong protests
2014 Hong Kong protests
HK (disambiguation)